Cameron Crestani (born 18 April 1996) is an Australian footballer who plays as a central defender for Strømmen IF. He previously played for Peninsula Power FC in the QLD NPL competition where he was named as NPL player of the year.

Club career
In May 2017, Brisbane Roar announced that they would not be signing Crestani on a senior contract for the 2017/18 season. He soon signed on as a marquee player for Western Pride in the National Premier League's Queensland competition.

In September 2017, Crestani scored Pride's first goal in a 2–1 win over Moreton Bay United FC to win the National Premier Leagues Queensland Grand Final, the club's first piece of major silverware.

A few days later it was announced Crestani had re-signed for Pride for the 2018 season.

In 2018 Crestani scored 3 goals in 24 appearances as Pride finished third. He was named stand-in captain for the middle section of the season after an injury to Jesse Rigby.

In 2022 Crestani moved to Norway to play third-tier soccer for Strømmen IF, a club managed by Australian Kasey Wehrman.

Personal life
Cameron is originally from Stanthorpe, Queensland, where he grew up on his parents' farm with four brothers. He graduated from Stanthorpe State High School in 2013 and currently studies a Bachelor of Secondary Education at Griffith University.

Crestani's other passion is cricket, having previously won 3 premierships in a row with Souths Cricket Club in the Stanthorpe District Cricket Competition. In 2016-17 he signed for Valley's Cricket Club and scored a club season-high 67 runs vs Tenterfield, including a towering six over mid-off off the bowling of former Southern Stars opening bowler, Amanda Carpenter.

References

1996 births
Living people
Association football defenders
Australian soccer players
Brisbane Roar FC players
A-League Men players
National Premier Leagues players
Strømmen IF players
Norwegian Second Division players
Australian expatriate soccer players
Expatriate footballers in Norway
Australian expatriate sportspeople in Norway